Gilliesia is a genus in the family Amaryllidaceae. The entire genus is native to Chile and Argentina.

Taxonomy

Species 
 Gilliesia curicana Ravenna - Maule in Chile
 Gilliesia dimera Ravenna - Maule in Chile
 Gilliesia graminea Lindl. - central Chile, Mendoza in Argentina
 Gilliesia isopetala Ravenna - O'Higgins in Chile
 Gilliesia monophylla Reiche - from Maule to Biobío in Chile
 Gilliesia montana Poepp. & Endl. from Maule to La Araucanía in Chile
 Gilliesia nahuelbutae Ravenna - Biobío in Chile

References

Bibliography 

 
 

Amaryllidaceae genera